Zaum was a music project band that included Tool drummer Danny Carey, along with Tool associates Chris Pitman, Vince DeFranco, and Marko Fox.

The official Tool newsletter of April 2000 had the following to say the about the project:

Zaum had some demos available a few years ago through Tool's management, Larrikin.  Lately the members Marco Fox, Danny Carey, and Mother Goose have been too busy to put something out, but are hoping to go through over twenty hours of material to put something together.

"Zaum" (Russian: заумь or заумный язык) is a word used to describe the linguistic experiments in sound symbolism and language creation of Russian Futurist poets such as Velimir Khlebnikov and Aleksei Kruchenykh.

Track listing
Currently Zaum have only released one demo, entitled Zaum.

 "Apparatus" – 5:32
 "Merkaba" – 6:56
 "Psychedelic Experience" – 4:28
 "Serpent" – 7:45

Track information
 All Zaum members can be considered as Tool alumni. Pitman and Fox are featured on the band's album Ænima. Pitman plays synthesizer on "Third Eye", while Fox contributed vocals for "Die Eier von Satan", as well as auditioning for the role of Tool's bassist after Paul D'Amour's departure from the band. In addition, DeFranco plays synthesizer on the live version of "Third Eye" on the band's box set Salival and worked as an engineer on the album Lateralus.
 The track "Apparatus" begins with a sample taken from the 1979 film Caligula, delivered by Malcolm McDowell: "I have existed from the morning of the world and I shall exist until the last star falls from the night. Although I have taken the form of Gaius Caligula, I am all men as I am no man and therefore I am a God."
 A track on Zaum's demo called "Merkaba" shares the same title as a Tool instrumental which appeared on Salival, while another track "Psychedelic Experience" features the same sample used in Tool's "Merkaba"

Band members
Chris Pitman – vocals, guitar, keyboards
Vince DeFranco – guitar
Marko Fox – bass guitar
Danny Carey – drums

References

Musical groups from Los Angeles
Electronic music groups from California